Royal Air Force Coolham or more simply RAF Coolham is a former Royal Air Force Advanced Landing Ground located in West Sussex, England.

The following units were here at some point:
 No. 129 Squadron RAF (1944)
 No. 133 Airfield RAF
 No. 133 (Polish) (Fighter) Wing RAF
 No. 135 (Fighter) Wing RAF
 No. 222 Squadron RAF (1944)
 No. 306 Polish Fighter Squadron (1944)
 No. 315 Polish Fighter Squadron (1944)
 No. 349 (Belgian) Squadron RAF (1944)
 No. 411 (Polish) Repair & Salvage Unit
 No. 485 Squadron RNZAF (1944)
 No. 1314 Mobile Wing RAF Regiment
 No. 2701 Squadron RAF Regiment
 No. 2722 Squadron RAF Regiment
 No. 2800 Squadron RAF Regiment
 No. 2829 Squadron RAF Regiment

References

Citations

Bibliography

Coolham